Pedaling to Freedom (2007) is a 28-minute documentary directed by Vijay S. Jodha. The film shows how a simple thing, such as teaching women to ride a bicycle in a deprived part of the world, can have a life-changing impact. The documentary was made in English and Tamil.

Content
Pedaling to Freedom is a documentary film set in Pudukkottai district of Tamil Nadu, India. The film revisits a year-long initiative that took place there in 1993, in what used to be one of the poorest parts of the world. As a result of this initiative 230,000 people learnt to read and write, and over 100,000 women learnt to ride bicycles. Wages increased 1000%. It happened in the space of just one year and cost less than one and a half dollars per person. The film relies on archival stills, filmed footage as well as interviews with those who were associated with the project.

Kannammal, an insurance company office assistant who took leave from work to volunteer for the project is featured prominently. She served as a central coordinator and at the end of the project, went back to her office where she remains an office assistant.

Mobility was seen as an important tool for empowerment and in addition to reading and writing, women were taught how to ride bicycles. The film captures the conditions in the district including cycling classes for women where men often gathered to crack jokes and taunt women trying to learn cycling. The film highlights the partnership between public and private bodies as well as work of 25,000 volunteers that made it possible.

See also
Accessibility (transport)
 Education in India
 With My Own Two Wheels
 World Bicycle Relief

References

External links
 P. Sainath "Where there's a wheel, there's a way" in Everybody Loves a Good Drought, Penguin, 2002
 UNESCO Document, Living Literacy; 2001, UNESCO, 2001
 UNESCO Document on Pudukkottai & other literacy initiatives worldwide
 Various Government of India documents dealing with education in India
 Pedaling to Freedom trailer
 How the bicycle became a symbol of women's emancipation

Indian short documentary films
Documentary films about cycling
2007 short documentary films